Monika Berwein (born 31 August 1957 in Garmisch-Partenkirchen) is a German former alpine skier who competed in the 1976 Winter Olympics.

External links
 sports-reference.com
 

1957 births
Living people
Olympic alpine skiers of West Germany
Alpine skiers at the 1976 Winter Olympics
German female alpine skiers
Sportspeople from Garmisch-Partenkirchen
20th-century German women